Rory Chappell (13 January 1959 - 14 August 2014) was a South African professional tennis player.

A left-handed player from Johannesburg, Chappell reached a career best singles ranking of 195 in the world and qualified for the main draw of the 1977 Wimbledon Championships.

Chappell died in 2014 at Rosebank Primary School in Johannesburg, where he worked as a tennis coach. He was 55 years of age.

References

External links
 
 

1959 births
2014 deaths
South African male tennis players
Sportspeople from Johannesburg